A referendum on a law protecting the Alpine region was held in Liechtenstein on 22 January 1967. The proposal was rejected by 61.0% of voters.

Results

References

1967 referendums
1967 in Liechtenstein
Referendums in Liechtenstein
January 1967 events in Europe